Pablo Insua Blanco (born 9 September 1993) is a Spanish professional footballer who plays as a central defender for Sporting de Gijón.

Club career

Deportivo
Born in Arzúa, Province of A Coruña, Insua was a youth product of local Deportivo de La Coruña. He made his debut as a senior with the reserves, representing them in both the Segunda División B and the Tercera División.

Insua made his official debut for the Galicians' first team on 25 November 2012, playing the last ten minutes of the 1–1 La Liga away draw against Athletic Bilbao. On 17 August of the following year, with the club again in the Segunda División, he scored his first professional goal, the only in a win at UD Las Palmas.

Insua renewed with Depor on 25 March 2014, signing until 2018. He was an ever-present figure during the season, appearing in 39 matches and scoring three goals as his team returned to the top flight at the first attempt.

Leganés
On 15 August 2015, Insua was loaned to CD Leganés of the second tier for one year. He scored once from 35 games in his first year, helping to a first ever top-division promotion.

Insúa's loan was renewed for a further season on 15 July 2016. He scored his first goal in the Spanish top tier on 21 January 2017, equalising a 2–2 away draw with Deportivo Alavés.

Schalke 04
On 29 June 2017, after contributing 29 appearances as Leganés retained their newly acquired status, Insua signed with FC Schalke 04 on a four-year deal for an undisclosed fee. In September, he suffered myocarditis which kept him out of play for months until he returned to training in January 2018. His Bundesliga debut occurred on 17 March, when he came on as a 64th-minute substitute in the 1–0 away defeat of VfL Wolfsburg.

Huesca
On 20 July 2018, Insua joined SD Huesca on a season-long loan. On 21 August 2019, the move was extended for another year.

Insua agreed to a permanent three-year contract on 1 August 2020, after the club exercised their option to buy. On 2 July 2022, his link was terminated.

Sporting Gijón
On 4 July 2022, Insua signed a two-year deal with Sporting de Gijón.

Career statistics

Honours
Huesca
Segunda División: 2019–20

Spain U19
UEFA European Under-19 Championship: 2012

References

External links

1993 births
Living people
People from Arzúa (comarca)
Sportspeople from the Province of A Coruña
Spanish footballers
Footballers from Galicia (Spain)
Association football defenders
La Liga players
Segunda División players
Segunda División B players
Tercera División players
Deportivo Fabril players
Deportivo de La Coruña players
CD Leganés players
SD Huesca footballers
Sporting de Gijón players
Bundesliga players
FC Schalke 04 players
Spain youth international footballers
Spanish expatriate footballers
Expatriate footballers in Germany
Spanish expatriate sportspeople in Germany